Joseph Patrick "JP" McGee is a United States Army major general who serves as the commanding general of the 101st Airborne Division and Fort Campbell since March 5, 2021. He previously served as director of the Army Talent Management Task Force in the office of the Army Deputy Chief of Staff (G-1) from July 2018 to February 2021, as well as deputy commanding general for operations of United States Army Cyber Command from July 2016 to June 2018. McGee also commanded the 1st Brigade Combat Team, 101st Airborne Division (also known as the Bastogne Brigade) from July 2011 to October 2013.

McGee's staff assignments include Deputy Executive Assistant to the 17th Chairman of the Joint Chiefs of Staff, Admiral Michael Mullen, and Executive Officer to the 38th Chief of Staff of the United States Army, General Raymond Odierno.

A native of Atherton, California, McGee is a 1986 graduate of Saint Francis High School in nearby Mountain View. He began active service in the army in 1989 and was commissioned as a second lieutenant in 1990. McGee is a graduate of the Infantry Officer Basic and Advanced Courses, Ranger School, Pathfinder School, and the United States Army Command and General Staff College. He holds a Bachelor of Science in Engineering from West Point, a master's degree in Administration from Central Michigan University, and is an alumnus of the army's Senior Fellows program, having served as a National Security Affairs Fellow at the Hoover Institution at Stanford University for the 2010–2011 academic year.

References

Date of birth missing (living people)
Year of birth missing (living people)
Living people
People from Atherton, California
Military personnel from California
United States Military Academy alumni
United States Army Rangers
Central Michigan University alumni
United States Army Command and General Staff College alumni
Recipients of the Legion of Merit
United States Army generals
Recipients of the Defense Superior Service Medal
Recipients of the Distinguished Service Medal (US Army)